An optical reader is a device found within most computer scanners that captures visual information and translates the image into digital information the computer is capable of understanding and displaying.

An example of optical readers are marksense systems for elections where voters mark their choice by filling a rectangle, circle, or oval, or by completing an arrow. After the voting a tabulating device reads the votes using "dark mark logic", whereby the computer selects the darkest mark within a given set as the intended choice or vote.

See also
Digital paper
Optical character recognition
Optical scan voting system
Optical mark recognition

References

Optical devices